Langbo Kangri (also known as Langpo Kangri) is a mountain peak in the Himalayas on the border of Nepal and Tibet Autonomous Region of China.

Location 

The peak is located 12.17 km north-northeast of Yangra Kangri (Ganesh I), to which a ridge connects it. The gap height is 1474 m.

Climbing history 
There are no documented ascents of Langbo Kangri.

References 

Gandaki Province
Mountains of the Himalayas
Wikipedia requested photographs by location
Six-thousanders of the Himalayas
Mountains of Nepal
Mountains of the Gandaki Province